Kwegu may refer to:
the Kwegu people
the Kwegu language